Among those who were born in the London Borough of Hounslow, or have live/lived within the borders of the modern borough are (alphabetical order):

A
 Marcus Akin – reality TV personality, karate practitioner, actor and writer, lives in Brentford
Cecil Aldin – artist and illustrator, lived in Chiswick from 1894 to 1904
 Mathangi "Maya" Arulpragasam (known as M.I.A.) – British recording artist, songwriter, painter and director, born in Hounslow
 David Attenborough – TV wildlife broadcaster, born in Isleworth
 Sarah Ayton – Olympic gold medallist in the Yngling sailing class, 2004 and 2008; lived in Ashford

B
Sir Joseph Banks – botanist, lived and died at Spring Grove in Isleworth, buried in Heston churchyard
Nicholas Barbon – economist and financial speculator, died at Osterley Park House
Jack Beresford – Olympic rower, lived in Chiswick from 1903 to 1940
Walter R. Booth (1882–1938) – creator of the first British animated cartoon film, The Hand of the Artist, lived in Isleworth
Jack Buckland – composer and recording artist, from the Chiswick area
Louise Burfitt-Dons – humanitarian, lives in Chiswick
Kate Beckinsale – English actress and model

C
Jimmy Carr – comedian, born in Hounslow
Thomas Chaloner – introduced alum mining to England
Asim Chaudhry – comedian, writer and director, born in Hounslow
Keith Chegwin – presenter – lived in Linkfield Road, Isleworth with his wife at the time, Maggie Philbin, Tomorrow's World presenter
Phil Collins – singer, musician and actor
Cyril Cusack – actor, lived in Hounslow

D
 Jaz Deol – actor
 Alec Dickson – founder of Voluntary Service Overseas
 Yvonne Drewry – artist
 Daniel Dumile (MF DOOM) – Hounslow-born, USA and UK-based rapper

E
 Merrick Elderton (1884–1939) – English cricketer and educator
 John Entwistle – bassist of legendary rock band, The Who
 Robert Evans – politician, Labour MEP 1994–2009; lived in Ashford
Sophie Ellis-Bextor – singer, born in Hounslow
Evan Edinger, Youtuber – resident of Hounslow until 2021

F
Mo Farah – athlete; current 10,000 metres Olympic champion and 5000 metres Olympic, World and European champion; grew up in Hounslow
Fenella Fielding – actress, lived in Chiswick
Michael Flanders – entertainer, lived in Chiswick from 1971 to 1975
E. M. Forster – author, a blue plaque in Arlington Park Mansions commemorates the flat where he lived until his death in 1970
Ugo Foscolo – artist, died at Turnham Green in 1827, cenotaph in Chiswick churchyard
Stephen Fox – politician, had a country retreat in Chiswick from 1663

G
 Joseph Gandy – architect, lived in Chiswick between 1833 and 1838
 Ian Gillan – rock singer for the band Deep Purple, born in Hounslow
 Ian Gilmour – politician, lived and died in Isleworth
 Hugh Grant – actor, lived in Chiswick as a child
 Russell Grant – astrologer and resident of Staines, became Lord of Ashford in 1996

H
William Hartnell – actor, best known for playing The First Doctor in Doctor Who; lived in Isleworth in the 1960s
Elias Henry "Patsy" Hendren – cricketer
William Hogarth – country home at Chiswick from 1749 until his death
Charles Holland – actor, born in Chiswick

J
The Earls of Jersey – lived at Osterley Park near Hounslow from 1804 until the 1940s

K
Patsy Kensit – actress, lived in Hounslow during her teenage years
Henry Killigrew – playwright, born in Hanworth

L
Bernard Lee – actor, famous as "M" in the James Bond films 1962–79, born 1908 in Brentford
John Lindley – botanist
Buster Lloyd-Jones – veterinarian, born in Feltham
Nick Lowe – musician, songwriter, producer; resident of Brentford
Dan Luger – Rugby World Cup winning winger

M
Betty Marsden – actor in Round The Horn and Carry On Camping, lived on a houseboat in Brentford until her death in 1998.
Freddie Mercury – British musician, singer, and songwriter, best known as the lead vocalist and lyricist of the rock band Queen, grew up in Feltham
Joe Miller – actor, lived at Strand-on-the-Green from 1686 to 1738
Nancy Mitford – lived briefly at Strand-on-the-Green
James Montgomrey – Brentford benefactor, owned and ran a large timber mill on Brentford High Street

N
Dukes of Northumberland – have lived at Syon House since Henry Percy, 9th Earl of Northumberland bought the estate in 1594.
Kunal Nayyar – third on the list of world's highest paid TV show actors, Nayyar was born in Hounslow. He is most famous for his role as Raj in CBS’ show The Big Bang Theory.

O
John Ogdon – pianist, lived in Spring Grove, Isleworth
Peter Oliver – painter, lived in Isleworth
Alistair Overeem – mixed martial arts fighter, born in Hounslow
Alun Owen – wrote screenplay to A Hard Day's Night

P
Jimmy Page – English musician, singer-songwriter, and record producer who achieved international success as the guitarist of the rock band Led Zeppelin, born in Heston
The Rev. Sir Robert Peat – Vicar of St Lawrence's, New Brentford
Lucien Pissarro – artist
Donald Pleasence – actor, lived at Strand-on-the-Green from 1973 to 1985
Bertram Pollock – clergyman and Bishop of Norwich, born at Hanworth
Ernest Pollock – brother of Bertram, politician and lawyer, lived at Hanworth and became the first Viscount Hanworth in 1936

R
Redgrave family – actors, lived at Bedford House from 1945 to 1954
Samuel Richardson – writer, tenant at Sutton Court from 1736 to 1738
Hugh Ronalds – nurseryman, horticulturalist and author, lived his life on Brentford High Street

S
 Naomi Scott – actress, singer and musician, starred as Jasmine in Aladdin
Jay Sean – R&B singer, signed to Lil Wayne's record company; born and raised in Hounslow
Jack Simmons – historian, born in Isleworth
Sergey Stepnyak-Kravchinsky – Russian revolutionary

T
Pete Townshend – rock guitarist, singer, and songwriter; guitarist and principal songwriter of The Who
Inigo Triggs – architect and garden designer, born in Chiswick
Tuke family – mental healthcare reformers
William Turner – artist, lived briefly in Isleworth

V
Vincent van Gogh – lived briefly in Isleworth

W
Jack Wild – actor who played Artful Dodger in Oliver, grew up in Hounslow
J. C. Winslow – Anglican missionary and hymn writer, born in Hanworth
Kim Wilde – English pop singer

Z
Johann Zoffany – artist, lived and died at Strand-on-the-Green

References

Hounslow
People from the London Borough of Hounslow